Corazón Bipolar is the third album by the Mexican singer Paty Cantú, released in 2012.

Track listing
 Corazón Bipolar
 Quiero X 2
 Aparador (feat. María Barracuda y Niña Dioz)
 Manual
 Hechos No Palabras!
 Mío –  Samples  Paulina Rubio's hit single Mío (1992)Mio – Paulina Rubio
 Silencios Que Salvan
 Suerte
 Ojalá
 El Sexo y el Amor
 Beat Goes On (feat. Boy Blue)
 Quiero Tenerte (feat. Erik Rubín)
 Si Pudiera

Certifications

References

Paty Cantú albums
2012 albums